Doug Clovechok is a Canadian politician, who was elected to the Legislative Assembly of British Columbia in the 2017 provincial election. He represents the electoral district of Columbia River-Revelstoke as a member of the British Columbia Liberal Party caucus.

Clovechok had previously run in 2013 in the same riding but was unsuccessful against incumbent Norm Macdonald. In his second attempt in 2017, he was elected over Gerry Taft in what was considered somewhat of an upset. The loss was attributed to a defamation suit that Taft lost during the middle of the campaign.

Prior to his election, he was a high school teacher with the Calgary Board of Education. He served for 20 years as the CEO of the Calgary Education Partnership Foundation. He was the Campus Manager of the College of the Rockies at Invermere.

Electoral record

References

British Columbia Liberal Party MLAs
Canadian schoolteachers
Living people
21st-century Canadian politicians
Year of birth missing (living people)